R. gigantea may refer to:
 Rhomborhina gigantea, a beetle species in the genus Rhomborhina
 Rhynchostylis gigantea, an orchid species found in Myanmar and Thailand
 Rivetina gigantea, a praying mantis species
 Rosa gigantea, a rose species native to northeast India, northern Myanmar and southwest China

See also
 Gigantea (disambiguation)